Byrum William "Barney" Cable (born July 29, 1935) is a retired American basketball player. The fourth most prolific rebounder in Bradley basketball history, Barney Cable, a six-foot-seven forward from Rochester, Pennsylvania, was only the third BU player to be plucked in the NBA draft since the school went big time in 1938.

He played collegiately for Bradley University.

He was selected by the Detroit Pistons in the 2nd round (11th pick overall) of the 1958 NBA draft.

He played for the Pistons (1958–59), Syracuse Nationals (1959–61), Chicago Packers / Zephyrs / Baltimore Bullets (1961, 1963–64) and St. Louis Hawks (1961–63) in the NBA for 362 games. In 1967, he was named Coach of the Year in the Eastern Professional Basketball League. He is honored in the Greater Peoria Sports Hall of Fame.

References

External links

1935 births
Living people
American men's basketball players
Baltimore Bullets (1963–1973) players
Basketball players from Pennsylvania
Bradley Braves men's basketball players
Chicago Packers expansion draft picks
Chicago Packers players
Chicago Zephyrs players
Detroit Pistons draft picks
Detroit Pistons players
People from Rochester, Pennsylvania
Power forwards (basketball)
St. Louis Hawks players
Syracuse Nationals players
Wilmington Blue Bombers players